Josefa Vicent (born 7 May 1950) is a Uruguayan sprinter. She competed in the women's 100 metres at the 1968 Summer Olympics.

References

1950 births
Living people
Athletes (track and field) at the 1968 Summer Olympics
Athletes (track and field) at the 1971 Pan American Games
Athletes (track and field) at the 1972 Summer Olympics
Uruguayan female sprinters
Olympic athletes of Uruguay
Place of birth missing (living people)
Pan American Games competitors for Uruguay
Olympic female sprinters
20th-century Uruguayan women